Merluccius tasmanicus is a species of fish from the family Merlucciidae from the western Pacific and south-eastern Pacific and south-western Atlantic which was described in 2006. It is however considered to be synonymous with Merluccius australis by some authorities.

References

Merluccius
Fish described in 2006